Drinkwater is a surname of English medieval origin. The German equivalent is Trinkwasser, in Italian Bevilacqua and in French Boileau.

People with the surname
Arthur Thomas Drinkwater (1894–1972), Australian-born World War I flying ace
Ben Drinkwater (1910–1949), motor-cycle racer
Bert Drinkwater (1895–1947), Australian footballer
Carol Drinkwater (born 1948), Anglo-Irish actress and author
Charles Drinkwater (soccer), American soccer player
Danny Drinkwater (born 1990), English football player
Graham Drinkwater (1875–1946), Canadian ice hockey player, businessman and philanthropist
Harry Drinkwater (1844–1895), British architect
Harold Drinkwater (1855–1925) British botanical artist
John Drinkwater (musician, technologist), (born 1957), English musician and sound technologist
John Drinkwater (playwright), (1882–1937), English poet and dramatist
John Elliot Drinkwater Bethune (1801–1851), British mathematician, educator, polymath known for his contributions in promoting women's education in British colonial India. He founded "Hindu Female School" in Calcutta (now Kolkata) which is now known as "Bethune School" and "Bethune College" (The first women's college in India)
John F. Drinkwater (born 1947), British historian
Josh Drinkwater (born 1992), Australian rugby player
Peter Drinkwater (1750–1801) English textile businessman
Ray Drinkwater (1931–2008), British soccer player
Ros Drinkwater (born 1944), Scottish-born actress
Sean T. Drinkwater (born 1972) American musician
Skip Drinkwater American record producer
Terry Drinkwater (1936–1989), American television and radio journalist
William Drinkwater (1812–1909), Manx judge

Fictional characters
Gerris Drinkwater, in A Song of Ice and Fire by George R. R. Martin
Nathaniel Drinkwater, protagonist of a series of novels by Richard Woodman

Notes

English-language surnames
Surnames of English origin